Darixon Eniel Vuelto Pérez (born 15 January 1998) is a Honduran professional footballer who plays as a forward for Costa Rican club Deportivo Saprissa on loan from Real España.

Club career
Born in Sambo Creek, Vuelto started playing in Victoria's youth setup. He made his senior debut for the club on 8 September 2013, aged only 15, starting in a 1–2 away loss against Olimpia.

On 16 October 2014 Vuelto scored his first goal as a senior, netting the equalizer in a 1–1 home draw against Marathón. In May of the following year he went on a trial at Danish Superliga club FC Midtjylland, but nothing came of it.

On 7 June 2016, Vuelto signed a one-year loan deal for Spanish Segunda División side CD Tenerife, for a fee of €12,000. Initially assigned to the reserves, he spent the whole pre-season with the main squad.

International career
He made his debut for Honduras national football team on 14 November 2019 in a CONCACAF Nations League game against Martinique.

Honours
Honduras Youth
 Pan American Silver Medal: 2019

References

External links

1998 births
Living people
People from Atlántida Department
Honduran footballers
Honduras international footballers
Association football midfielders
Association football wingers
Liga Nacional de Fútbol Profesional de Honduras players
Tercera División players
USL Championship players
Liga FPD players
C.D. Victoria players
Real C.D. España players
CD Tenerife B players
Portland Timbers 2 players
Deportivo Saprissa players
Honduran expatriate footballers
Honduran expatriate sportspeople in Spain
Honduran expatriate sportspeople in the United States
Honduran expatriate sportspeople in Costa Rica
Expatriate footballers in Spain
Expatriate soccer players in the United States
Expatriate footballers in Costa Rica
Pan American Games medalists in football
Pan American Games silver medalists for Honduras
Footballers at the 2019 Pan American Games
Honduras youth international footballers
Medalists at the 2019 Pan American Games
Honduras under-20 international footballers